This article lists all the women (134) who have won past and present major championships on the LPGA Tour. They are listed in order of the number of victories. The list is updated through the 2022 season.

Winning span indicates the years from the player's first major win to the last.

By country

See also
Chronological list of LPGA major golf champions
List of men's major championships winning golfers

References

 
LPGA major winners